Blue Springs Creek Conservation Area consists of  about  southwest of Bourbon, Missouri. The creek is fed by four springs located on private property in its watershed. Blue Springs Creek is managed for rainbow trout, while the area supports abundant populations of white-tailed deer, wild turkey, and squirrels. Current management is focused on improving quail habitat. Hunting and fishing are permitted as long as appropriate regulations are followed.

The area was originally acquired by the Missouri Department of Conservation from the Army Corps of Engineers in 1983 and was expanded when an additional tract was added in 1992. There is a boat launch and three parking areas in the conservation area.

References

Protected areas established in 1983
Protected areas of Crawford County, Missouri
Conservation Areas of Missouri
Rivers of Crawford County, Missouri
Rivers of Missouri
1983 establishments in Missouri